Oxford Hotel may refer to:

in Singapore
 Oxford Hotel (Singapore), located at Queen Street

in the United States
(by state)
 Oxford Hotel (Denver, Colorado), listed on the NRHP in Colorado
 Oxford Hotel (West Baden Springs, Indiana), listed on the NRHP in Indiana
 Oxford Hotel (Oxford, Pennsylvania), listed on the NRHP in Pennsylvania